The Tumultuous Petitioning Act 1661 (13 Cha. 2 St. 1 c. 5) was an Act of the Parliament of England. Its long title was "An Act against Tumults and Disorders upon pretence of preparing or presenting publick Peticions or other Addresses to His Majesty or the Parliament".

Petitions to either the House of Commons or House of Lords seem to have been later in origin than petitions to the Crown. They are not referred to in the Bill of Rights (1688 or 1689), but the right of petition is a convention of the constitution. Petitions to the Lords or the whole Parliament can be traced back to Henry III. No petition to the Commons has been found earlier than Richard II; but from the time of Henry IV petitions to the Commons have been freely made. The political importance of petitioning dates from about the reign of Charles I. The development of the practice of petitioning had proceeded so far in the reign of Charles II as to lead to the passing in 1662 of an Act against "tumultuous petitioning". It provides that no petition or address shall be presented to the king or either house of Parliament by more than ten persons; nor shall any one procure above twenty persons to consent or set their hands to any petition for alteration of matters established by law in church or state, unless with the previous order of three justices of the county, or the major part of the grand jury.

It was repealed by section 40(3) of, and Schedule 3 to, the Public Order Act 1986.

See also
Sedition Act 1661

References

'Charles II, 1661: An Act against Tumults and Disorders upon p[re]tence of p[re]paring or p[re]senting publick Petic[i]ons or other Addresses to His Majesty or the Parliament', Statutes of the Realm: Volume 5: 1628-80 (1819), p. 308. URL: http://www.british-history.ac.uk/report.asp?compid=47289. Date accessed: 21 July 2018.
Text of the Act at constitution.org, go to (G)

Acts of the Parliament of England
1661 in England
1661 in law
Repealed English legislation